Jānis Hermanis (born 18 May 1970) is a Latvian cross-country skier. He competed at the 1992 Winter Olympics, the 1994 Winter Olympics and the 1998 Winter Olympics.

References

1970 births
Living people
Latvian male cross-country skiers
Olympic cross-country skiers of Latvia
Cross-country skiers at the 1992 Winter Olympics
Cross-country skiers at the 1994 Winter Olympics
Cross-country skiers at the 1998 Winter Olympics
People from Pļaviņas Municipality
20th-century Latvian people